Steve Coll (born October 8, 1958) is an American journalist, academic and executive.

He is currently the dean of the Columbia University Graduate School of Journalism, where he is also the Henry R. Luce Professor of Journalism. A staff writer for The New Yorker, he served as the president and CEO of the New America think tank from 2007 to 2012.

He is the recipient of two Pulitzer Prize awards, two Overseas Press Club Awards, a PEN American Center John Kenneth Galbraith Award, an Arthur Ross Book Award, a Livingston Award, a Robert F. Kennedy Journalism Award, a Financial Times and Goldman Sachs Business Book of the Year Award, and the Lionel Gelber Prize. From 2012 to 2013, he was a voting member of the Pulitzer Prize Board before continuing to serve in an ex officio capacity as the dean of the Columbia Journalism School.

Early life and family 
Steve Coll was born on October 8, 1958, in Washington, D.C. He attended Thomas S. Wootton High School in Rockville, Maryland, graduating in 1976. He moved to Los Angeles, California, and enrolled in Occidental College, where he was a member of Phi Beta Kappa. In 1980, he graduated cum laude with majors in English and history. Coll also attended the University of Sussex during his studies.

Coll is married to the journalist and poet Eliza Griswold.

Career

Journalism 

After college, Coll wrote for the Pasadena Weekly. He then wrote general-interest articles for California magazine.

In 1985, he started working for The Washington Post as a general assignment feature writer for the paper's Style section. Two years later, he was promoted to serve as the financial correspondent for the newspaper, based in New York City. He and David A. Vise collaborated on a series of reports scrutinizing the Securities and Exchange Commission for which they received the 1990 Pulitzer Prize for Explanatory Reporting and the Gerald Loeb Award for Large Newspapers. In 1989, he moved to New Delhi, when he was appointed as the Post's South Asia bureau chief. He served as a foreign correspondent through 1995.

Coll began working for the newspaper's Sunday magazine insert in 1995, serving as publisher of the magazine from 1996 to 1998. He was promoted to managing editor of the newspaper in 1998 and served in that capacity through 2004. He has also served as an associate editor for the newspaper from late 2004 to August 2005.

In September 2005, Coll joined the writing staff of The New Yorker. Based in Washington, D.C., he reported on foreign intelligence and national security.

New America Foundation 

On July 23, 2007, Coll was named as the next director of the New America Foundation, a non-profit, non-partisan think tank headquartered in Washington, D.C. He has also contributed to the New York Review of Books, particularly about the war in Afghanistan. On June 25, 2012, Coll announced his resignation as President of the New America Foundation to pen a follow up to Ghost Wars.

On October 23, 2012, Coll was elected to the Pulitzer Prize Board, administered by Columbia University.

Columbia University Graduate School of Journalism 
On March 18, 2013, Coll was announced to succeed Nick Lemann as the Dean of the Columbia University Graduate School of Journalism, effective July 1, 2013.

Honors and awards 
 1990: Pulitzer Prize for Explanatory Reporting (co-winner with David A. Vise)
 1991: Livingston Award for International Reporting for "Crisis and Change in South Asia", The Washington Post (winner)
 2000: Robert F. Kennedy Journalism Award for "Peace Without Justice: A Journey to the Wounded Heart of Africa", The Washington Post (1st Prize: International Print)
 2000: Ed Cunningham Award for "Peace Without Justice: A Journey to the Wounded Heart of Africa", The Washington Post
 2004: Lionel Gelber Prize for Ghost Wars: The Secret History of the CIA, Afghanistan, and Bin Laden, from the Soviet Invasion to September 10, 2001 (winner)
 2004: Cornelius Ryan Award for Ghost Wars: The Secret History of the CIA, Afghanistan, and Bin Laden, from the Soviet Invasion to September 10, 2001 (winner)
 2005: Pulitzer Prize for General Non-Fiction for Ghost Wars: The Secret History of the CIA, Afghanistan, and Bin Laden, from the Soviet Invasion to September 10, 2001 (winner)
 2005: Arthur Ross Book Award for Ghost Wars: The Secret History of the CIA, Afghanistan, and Bin Laden, from the Soviet Invasion to September 10, 2001 (winner)
 2008: National Book Critics Circle Award (biography) for The Bin Ladens: An Arabian Family in the American Century (finalist)
 2009: PEN/John Kenneth Galbraith Award for The Bin Ladens: An Arabian Family in the American Century (winner)
 2012: Financial Times and Goldman Sachs Business Book of the Year Award for Private Empire (winner)
 2012: National Book Critics Circle Award (nonfiction) for Private Empire (finalist)
 2018: National Book Critics Circle Award (nonfiction) for Directorate S (winner)

Bibliography

Podcasts

References

External links

 Steve Coll at The New York Review of Books

Interviews 
 Steve Coll discusses Ghost Wars on National Public Radio's All Things Considered, August 2004 (three-part online audio series)
 Hour-long interview about "The Bin Ladens: An Arabian Family in the American Century" by Amy Goodman on Democracy Now!, September 15, 2008 (video, audio, and print transcript)
 Video (with mp3 available) of conversation with Coll on Bloggingheads.tv
 Webcast Interview on The Bin Ladens at the Pritzker Military Museum & Library on October 23, 2008
 Webcast Interview on Ghost Wars at the Pritzker Military Museum & Library on January 27, 2005

1958 births
Living people
American newspaper reporters and correspondents
American newspaper editors
American male journalists
American war correspondents
War correspondents of the War in Afghanistan (2001–2021)
American non-fiction crime writers
The New Yorker staff writers
Espionage writers
Occidental College alumni
Pulitzer Prize for General Non-Fiction winners
Pulitzer Prize for Explanatory Journalism winners
20th-century American non-fiction writers
21st-century American non-fiction writers
20th-century American male writers
New America (organization)
Gerald Loeb Award winners for Large Newspapers
Carnegie Council for Ethics in International Affairs
21st-century American male writers
Columbia University faculty